Oscar Gozos is a Filipino politician who served as Mayor of Lipa City, Batangas until June 30, 2010. He was born on September 12, 1950 in Brgy. Sta. Cruz, Rosario, Batangas. He is married to Nilda Mercado.

Education
He was salutatorian when he finished his elementary in Our Lady of Rosary Academy in Lipa City, Batangas on 1961. Since he studied in a Catholic school in his elementary days, he decided to enter a seminary for his high school. He finished high school in St. Francis de Sales Seminary in Lipa City. He took up AB Political Science in University of the Philippines. He obtained his Bachelor of Laws from the same university in 1976.

Lawyer

After becoming a lawyer he became a managing partner of Gozos, Marquez, De Jesus, Linatoc Law Offices. He was also an original partner for Manalo Puno Gozos and Mendoza Law Offices.

Past government positions

Notes

References
 Oscar Gozos Personal Information

People from Lipa, Batangas
20th-century Filipino lawyers
Living people
1950 births
Lakas–CMD (1991) politicians
Members of the House of Representatives of the Philippines from Batangas
Members of the Batangas Provincial Board
Mayors of places in Batangas
University of the Philippines alumni